Actrix  is a snout moth genus in the subfamily Phycitinae. It was described by Carl Heinrich in 1956. It contains two species:  Actrix nyssaecolella, which was originally described as Tacoma nyssaecolella by Harrison Gray Dyar Jr. in 1904, and Actrix dissimulatrix.

Species
Actrix nyssaecolella (Dyar, 1904) – tupelo leaffolder moth
Actrix dissimulatrix Heinrich, 1956

References

Phycitinae
Pyralidae genera
Taxa named by Carl Heinrich